Alessia Busi (born 10 May 1994, in Milan) is an Italian ice dancer. With partner Andrea Fabbri, she is a two-time (2012, 2013) Italian national junior silver medalist and finished 17th at the 2013 World Junior Championships.

Programs 
(with Fabbri)

Competitive highlights 
(with Fabbri)

References

External links 
 

1994 births
Italian female ice dancers
Living people
Figure skaters from Milan
20th-century Italian women
21st-century Italian women